American pop rock band R5 has embarked on five concert tours, two of which have been worldwide, and two promotional tours. In March 2010, they self-released an EP, Ready Set Rock, and in September released their debut studio album with Hollywood Records. The second EP, Loud, was released on February 19, 2013, which featured the lead single and title track "Loud", the debut single from upcoming album. The band's first full-length album, Louder, was released on September 24, 2013, and the album not only includes the four songs from Loud and also seven new songs. The second single from the album, "Pass Me By", premiered on Radio Disney on August 16. The music video premiered on 29 August on Disney Channel and is available for public viewing on the band's Vevo channel. The third single, "(I Can't) Forget About You", was released on December 25, 2013, and reached number 47 on Billboard Digital Pop Songs, and the fourth single "One Last Dance" on May 29, 2014.

The third extended play, entitled Heart Made Up on You, was released on July 22, 2014, and the self-titled single on August 1, 2014. On November 16, 2014, the band released the first single from second album, "Smile".

West Coast Tour

West Coast Tour was the debut concert tour by band R5. The tour was supported by Radio Disney and served to promote the band's name with the teen crowd. The tour started on May 3, 2012, and ending on May 15, with 10 dates and traveled only to west coast.

Background
On April 26, 2012, the band signed a deal with Hollywood Records.  The first promotion plan was to send the band to tour in partnership with Radio Disney to promote the band's name to public. Entitled West Coast Tour, the tour started on May 3, 2012, at The Boardwalk in Orangevale, California and ending on May 15, at Slims Club in San Francisco. Altogether the band traveled to ten cities only the west coast. The band played songs from their first extended play Ready Set Rock, released in 2010, some songs from the soundtrack of Austin & Ally, three new songs and the Carly Rae Jepsen's cover version of "Call Me Maybe". During the last live show Ross cut his foot while dropping the microphone.

Setlist
 "Double Take"
 "Take You There"
 "Cali Girls"
 "Baby It's You"
 "Not a Love Song Song"
 "All About the Girls"
 "Love to Love Her"
 "Call Me Maybe"
 "Wishing I Was 23"
 "DNA"
 "What Do I Have To Do"	
 "Heard It On The Radio"
 "Anything You Want"
 "Say You'll Stay"
 "Keep Away From This Girl"
 "A Billion Hits"

Tour dates

East Coast Tour

East Coast Tour was the second concert tour by band R5. As well as West Coast Tour, the concerts was supported by Radio Disney and served to promote the band's name with the teen crowd. The tour started on December 15, 2012, and ending on December 31.

Background
On October 19, Ross announced the concert tour and 13 dates in his Twitter. The East Coast Tour started on December 15, 2012, in Jamestown, New York, and ending on December 31 in Syracuse, New York, with 16 dates only to east coast. It was also the first time the band traveled to another country, Canada, to play at Mod Club Theatre. The setlist consisted in songs of their first extended play Ready Set Rock, released in 2010, some songs from the soundtrqack of Austin & Ally, The Ting Tings's cover version of "Shut Up and Let Me Go" and the Christmas song "Christmas Is Coming".

To promote the tour the band launched the "Crazy 4 U Contest". The R5' fans sent thematic photos about the song "What Are U Crazy 4?" TO Everloop.com website and the top five have won prizes and five-minute on Skype with the band.

Critical reception
Lauren Hoffman to Concert Music Magazine was positive and said the members are "a very unique and fun band" and "have definitely made their dent in the music world". She also said that the live performance was energetic, exciting and catchy and mentioned that they were really excited with the public, not just for the money. Hoffman also commented: "Definitely had us leaving wanting more".

Opening acts
 Brandon and Savannah
 Taylor Mathews

Set list
 "Crazy 4 U"
 "Heartbeat" / "Can't Do It Without You" / "Better Together" / "Not a Love Song"
 "Heard It on the Radio"
 "Can You Feel It"
 "Say You'll Stay
 "Cali Girls"
 "Keep Away"
 "Shut Up and Let Me Go" 
 "What Do I Have to Do?"  
 "Love To Love Her" 
 "Wishing I Was 23"
 "Take U There"	
 "A Billion Hits"
 "Christmas Is Coming"

Tour dates

Loud Tour

Loud Tour was the third concert tour by band R5 and the first worldwide tour, promoting their second studio EP and debut album with Hollywood Records Loud. This tour also promoted the soundtrack of Austin & Ally. The Tour began on March 15, 2013, in Santa Ana, California and ended on July 5, 2013, in London, England. The tour included 38 dates in the United States, 8 in Canada, 2 in France and 2 in England.

Critical reception
Brie David to Canadian magazine Faze said was impressed with the crowd screaming for the band. He mentioned the harmony between Ross, Riker and Rocky and said "they could do more than just sing and play an instrument. Throughout the show, the boys showed off their smooth moves while dancing and playing their instruments in sync". David also commented that the group didn't use special effects and their talent prevailed. "This concert was definitely one to remember as R5 showed their true talent without any special effects. The amazing music and friendly people definitely wishing they could go back to this night". Joe Cage to Hit Zone Online said watching the group's concert was an amazing experience to never forget. He said the band was great to escape of the "boyband stereotype" and commented "They did their share to make sure the crowd was having a good time, whether it was getting everyone to clap and sing along, to taking instagram pictures, to "almost" crowd surfing. A great time was had by all".

Opening acts
DJ Ryland Lynch (Main dates)
 Taylor Mathews (March 15 – May 14)
 Alex Aiono (March 15-May14)
 Brandon and Savannah (March 15 – March 24 / May 15 – May 19)
 Sunderland (March 30 – April 19)
 Hollywood Ending (April 20 – May 14)

Setlist
"Fallin' for You"
"Cali Girls"
"Can You Feel It" 
"I Want You Bad"
"Say You'll Stay"
"Not a Love Song"
"Keep Away From This Girl"
"Pour Some Sugar on Me" / "Shut Up and Let Me Go"
"Heard It on the Radio" 
"Wishing I Was 23"	
"Crazy 4 U"
"Here Comes Forever"
"A Billion Hits"
"Loud"

Notes 

 "Thrift Shop" and "Work Out"  were performed in various concerts.
 Def Leppard's "Pour Some Sugar on Me" was performed at Santa Ana, San Diego, Montreal and Vancouver.

Tour dates

Louder World Tour

Louder World Tour was the fourth concert tour and second worldwide tour by family band R5, promoting their first studio album and debut full-length album with Hollywood Records, Louder. The Tour began on December 7, 2013, in Mexico City and ended on June 14, 2014. The tour includes dates in Western Asia, Europe, Central America, Canada and United States. The tour venues were chosen by R5's fans, as R5 designed an interactive map on R5rocks.com, where fans could vote for where they wanted R5 to perform. During the concert in San Juan, Puerto Rico, the vocalist Ross Lynch record his television film Teen Beach Movie.

Critical reception
Celeb Secrets 4 U called the show "different and amazing". He also said that the songs are "catchy and upbeat" and cited as highlights  "(I Can't) Forget About You", "I Want U Bad", "What Do I Have To Do" and Prince's cover "Let's Go Crazy". Jenny Williams to Light Out said the live performance on the tour is exciting and energizing and "awareness of modern popular references, full of bright and cheery tracks with strong, unforgettable hooks". She also commented that "Ain't No Way" and "If I Can't Be With You" had great performances.

Adrii Cortés to El Nuevo Dia said the band has evolved compared to previous tours and was more rock and roll and the concert was great. Joshua Betancourt Ruiz to Akistoi made a mixed critical about Puerto Rico concert. He said the band arrived 1h30 late, the concert had technical problems and had no effect and original stage as in the United States. But he also said the band was' catchy and had energy and adrenaline.

Broadcast and recordings
On February 28, 2014, Ross announced that the band would record the London concert, on March 4, 2014, on The O2, during their European leg. He said "We are gonna film our show in London on Tuesday! Who wants some camera time?". They planned to launch a concert movie, but it never happened. On 25 April 2014 the band released the first tour live video, the OneRepublic's cover "Counting Stars", featured the British band The Vamps. Weekly, another five videos were released: "(I Can't) Forget About You", on May 1, "Ain't No Way We're Goin' Home", on May 8, "Loud", on May 16, "Pass Me By", on May 22, and "One Last Dance, on May 29. They also released an extended play, Live in London, with the six songs.

Opening acts
DJ Ryland Lynch (Europe and Asia)
Brandon and Savannah (North America, United Kingdom and Ireland)

Setlist
 "Girls"
 "(I Can't) Forget About You"
 "Here Comes Forever"
 "Fallin' For You"
 "Pass Me By"
 "Wishing I Was 23"
 "Love Me Again"
 "What Do I Have To Do?" / "Valerie" 
 "A Billion Hits"
 "If I Can't Be With You"
 "Love Me Like That"
 "One Last Dance"
 "Counting Stars" 
 "I Want U Bad"
 "Cali Girls"
 "Ain't No Way We're Goin' Home"
 "Loud"

Notes 

 "Shut Up and Let Me Go" and "Let's Go Crazy" were performed on select dates.
 The band performed Neon Trees' "Sleeping with a Friend" in Amsterdam and Munich.

Tour dates

Live on Tour

Live on Tour was the fifth concert tour by band R5. The tour served to promote the extended play Heart Made Up on You and songs of album Louder with 24 dates in North America. They also traveled for the first time to South America for 4 concerts. It was started on September 3, 2014, and ending on November 28.

Background
On June 10, 2014, the band announced their new concert tour during a live chat in their website. Ross revealed on his Twitter the first 19 cities and said "Had crazy fun on the first leg of the US tour these past 2 and half weeks!! Can't wait to do it again in September". The tickets went for pre-sale on June 10 on the R5's website and for official sale on June 13. To promote the tour the band appeared in some television programs as The Ellen DeGeneres Show, Good Morning America and Live! with Kelly and Michael.

Concert synopsis
The setlist consists mainly to promote the songs released on the extended play Heart Made Up on You, some songs from Louder and five cover versions: "Let's Go Crazy" by Prince, "Drunk in Love" by Beyoncé, "Valerie" by Amy Winehouse and "Seven Nation Army" by The White Stripes. An additional date has been announced on September 29, 2014, at Gramercy Theatre, in New York City. The event was a partnership with Yahoo!, entitled "R5 for $5", selling special tickets for $5 for the fans. To promote the event the band held a live chat answering questions. Later other nine dates were announced, including four in South America, two in Brazil and two in Argentina, the first time the band toured in South. They also released a video-diary series about the tour on their official channel.

During the first concert, Ross was sick and they had difficulties in the performances. In an interview with The Magazine, Ross told talked about it: "The first bit started off a little slower because I was a little sick, well for me personally. There is always something nice about being sick on the road because you can always look forward to getting better. The tour keeps getting better and better. Every night we will look at our show and look at the weakest section, and we’ll fix it and make it better. As the tour goes on, it gets better. We like to change it up too. Change the set".

Critical reception
The UOL was positive and said the band does not need special effects and a great production to be exciting. He also said that the R5 flees the teen stereotype and plays rock and roll and would be a great choice for the festival Rock in Rio. Leticia Annes to Teen said the concert focus was on members and their voices were perfect live. The G1 News compared the band to 5 Seconds of Summer and The Vamps and said they were dynamic live.

Opening acts
 DJ Ryland Lynch (Main dates)
 Brandon and Savannah (Main dates)
 Jessarae (only in Westbury)

Setlist
 "Let's Go Crazy"
 "(I Can't) Forget About You"
 "Easy Love"
 "If I Can't Be With You"
 "Pass Me By"
 "Ain't no Way We're Goin' Home"
 "Things Are Looking Up"
 "Drunk in Love" / "What Do I Have To Do" / "Valerie" 
 "Love Me Like That"
 "One Last Dance"
 "Seven Nation Army"
 "I Want U Bad"
 "Cali Girls"
 "Stay With Me"
 "Loud"
 "Heart Made Up on You"

Notes

 "Say You'll Stay" was performed during the second Argentina concert.
 "Smile" was added to the set list on November 25.

Tour dates

Box office data

Sometime Last Night Tour

Sometime Last Night Tour is the sixth concert tour by band R5. The tour was announced on April 6, 2015, together with premiere of music video for second song Let's Not Be Alone Tonight and began in Hershey, Pennsylvania on June 30, 2015.

Background
The United States leg of the tour was announced on April 6, 2015, together with premiere of music video for second song Let's Not Be Alone Tonight from band's upcoming sophomore studio album which release date, July 10, 2015, was also announced. European leg of the tour was announced on June 5, 2015, during band's livestream. The Japanese leg of the tour was announced on October 14, 2015. The South American leg of the tour was announced on October 16, 2015, on Twitter. Shows in Australia and New Zealand were announced on October 22, 2015, on Twitter.

Opening act
DJ Ryland Lynch 
Jacob Whitesides 
Jack & Jack 
At Sunset 
Parade of Lights 
Max Schneider

Setlist
Us and Europe
 "All Night"
 "Heart Made up on You"
 "Let's Not Be Alone Tonight"
 "Dark Side"
 "Cali Girls"
 "Easy Love"
 "Loud"
 "I Know You Got Away" 
 "I Want U Bad"
 "Let's Go Crazy" 
 "Lightning Strikes"
 "You and I" 
 "F.E.E.L. G.O.O.D."
 "Repeating Days"
 "Did You Have Your Fun?"
 "(I Can't) Forget About You"
 "Wild Hearts"
 "Ain't No Way We're Goin' Home"
 "Smile"

South America
 "Heart Made Up On You"
 "Let's Not Be Alone Tonight"
 "Dark Side"
 "Cali Girls"
 "Easy Love"
 "All Night"
 "I Know You Got Away"
 "Repeating Days"
 "Lightning Strikes"
 "Pass Me By"
 "Loud" 
 "F.E.E.L.G.O.O.D"
 "Did You Have Your Fun?"
  "I Can't Say I'm In Love"
 "(I Can't) Forget About You"
 "Wild Hearts"
 "All This Things That I've Done" (cover)
 "Smile"

Asia
 "F.E.E.L.G.O.O.D
 "Dark Side"
 "Did You Have Your Fun?"
 "Easy Love"
 "Cali Girls"
 "Let's Not Be Alone Tonight"
 "If I Can't Be With You"
 "I Know You Got Away"
 "Repeating Days"
 "Lightning Strikes"
 "Pass Me By Unplugged"
 "Loud Unplugged"
 "All Night"
 "Heart Made Up On You"
 "(I Can't) Forget About You"
 "Wild Hearts"
 "Last Nite"
 "Smile"

 In Sterling Heights, the band performed "I Can't Say I'm In Love" for the first time.
 They recorded the show of Los Angeles and released in DVD, entitled Live at the Greek Theatre, on March 11, 2016.
 In Buenos Aires, the band performed "Seven Nation Army" and "Let's Go Crazy".
 In Mendoza, the band performed "One Last Dance".

Tour dates

Festivals and other miscellaneous performances

Frontier City Summer Concert Series
Elitch Gardens Summer Concert Series
Marymoor Park Concert Series
Minnesota State Fair
Maryland State Fair
Great New York State Fair

Cancelled dates

New Addictions Tour

New Addictions Tour is the seventh and final concert tour by American band R5. The tour was announced along with the release of their new EP "New Addictions" on May 12, 2017. The tour began on June 17, 2017, and ended on January 25, 2018.

Opening act
DJ Ryland Lynch
Jorge Blanco (Europe: September 24 – October 22)
Lucas Nord.

Setlist
 "If"
 "Need You Tonight"
 "Easy Love"
 "All Night"
 "(I Can't) Forget About You"
 "F.E.E.L.G.O.O.D"
 "Dark Side"
 "I Want U Bad"
 "Trading Time" 
 "Repeating Days"
 "Do It Again"
 "Loud"
 "Waiting on the World to Change"
 "Heart Made Up on You"
 "Red Velvet"
 "Wild Hearts"	
 "Smile"
 "The Chain"
 "Did You Have Your Fun?"

Tour dates

Promotional tours

3M Tour

3M Tour was the first promotional concert tour by band R5. The concert series's name was inspired by the title of the three cities, all beginning with "M". The tour included only three dates: Madison on November 18, 2012, Milwaukee on November 19 and Minneapolis on November 20. The tour included the first time the possibility to buy VIP tickets, including prizes, photographs and meet the band. The setlist consisted in songs of their first extended play Ready Set Rock, released in 2010 and The Ting Tings's cover version of "Shut Up and Let Me Go". After the tour, the band released a mini-documentary about the concert on their official channel on December 20, 2012.

Setlist
 "Crazy 4 U"
 Medley: "Heartbeat" / "Not a Love Song"
 "Heard It on the Radio"
 "Can You Feel It"
 "Say You'll Stay
 "Cali Girls"
 "Keep Away"
 "Shut Up and Let Me Go" (The Ting Tings cover)
 "What Do I Have to Do?"  
 "Love To Love Her" 
 "Wishing I Was 23"
 "Take U There"	
 "A Billion Hits"

Tour dates

Dancing Out My Pants Tour

Dancing Out My Pants Tour was the second promotional concert tour by band R5. The tour served to promote the debut album of the band, Louder, traveling in North America. The also played some previous songs and The Script's cover "Breakeven". The tour started on September 3, 2013, in Orlando, Florida, and ending on September 27, in Mashantucket Pequot Tribe, Connecticut.

Setlist
 "(I Can't) Forget About You"
 "Here Comes Forever"
 "Pass Me By"
 "Crazy 4 U"
 "I Want You Bad"
 "What Do I Have to Do?"
 "A Billion Hits"
 "If I Can't Be With You"
 "Breakeven" (The Script cover)
 "Love Me Like That"
 "Wishing I Was 23"	
 "Fallin' for You"
 "Cali Girls"
 "Ain't No Way We're Goin' Home"
 "One Last Dance"
 "Loud"

Tour dates

References

R5
R5 (band) concert tours